Everything but You may refer to:

 "Everything but You" (Clean Bandit song), 2022
 "Everything but You" (Brian McFadden song), 2008
 "Everything but You", song by Megan McKenna from Story of Me, 2018
 "Everything but You", song by Don George, 1945